Augustus Charles Lennox FitzRoy, 7th Duke of Grafton  (22 June 1821 – 4 December 1918), styled Lord Augustus FitzRoy before 1882, was a British Army officer. He was the second son of Henry FitzRoy, 5th Duke of Grafton, and his wife Mary Caroline Cranfield Berkeley, daughter of Admiral the Hon. Sir George Cranfield Berkeley.

On 9 June 1847, he married Anna Balfour (15 June 1825 – 23 December 1857), daughter of James Balfour MP. Together, they had four children:

Lady Eleanor FitzRoy (1853–1905), married Walter Harbord, son of Edward Harbord, 3rd Baron Suffield, and had issue.
Henry James FitzRoy, Earl of Euston (1848–1912), married Kate Walsh; no issue.
Alfred FitzRoy, 8th Duke of Grafton (1850–1930)
Lord Charles Edward FitzRoy (1857–1911), married his distant cousin Ismay FitzRoy, daughter of the 3rd Baron Southampton, and had issue (Charles FitzRoy, 10th Duke of Grafton).

He died in 1918, aged 97, at Wakefield Lodge near Potterspury, Northamptonshire.

References

External links

1821 births
1918 deaths
107
Earls of Arlington
Knights of the Garter
Companions of the Order of the Bath
A
Augustus